A total lunar eclipse took place on Sunday, November 18, 1956.

Visibility

Related lunar eclipses

Lunar year series

Tritos series

Half-Saros cycle
A lunar eclipse will be preceded and followed by solar eclipses by 9 years and 5.5 days (a half saros). This lunar eclipse is related to two annular solar eclipses of Solar Saros 132.

Tzolkinex 
 Preceded: Lunar eclipse of October 7, 1949
 Followed: Lunar eclipse of December 30, 1963

See also
List of lunar eclipses
List of 20th-century lunar eclipses

Notes

External links

1956-11
1956 in science
November 1956 events